The Aramis [1989] 1 Lloyd’s Rep 213 is an English case, relevant for the concept of an implied contract.

It has been superseded by Equitable Life v Hyman and AG of Belize v Belize Telecom Ltd.

Facts

The case concerned the question whether a contract could be implied between the transferee of a bill of lading to whom the goods had been delivered and the carrier. Prior to the Carriage of Goods By Sea Act 1992 the implication of such a contract was necessary if the transferee and the carrier were to have rights enforceable between themselves in respect of, for example, damage to the goods or the payment of freight.

Judgment
Bingham LJ considered the authorities at some length to see how the implication of contracts in this field had grown and developed. He cited with approval from the judgment of May LJ in The Elli which said,

Bingham LJ then continued himself to say,

See also
Blackpool and Fylde Aero Club Ltd v Blackpool BC
Baird Textile Holdings Ltd v Marks & Spencer plc [2001] EWCA Civ 274
Attorney General of Belize v Belize Telecom Ltd

References 
 Citations

United Kingdom labour case law
English contract case law
Court of Appeal (England and Wales) cases
1989 in case law
1989 in British law